Ebenezer Finley Cromwell (July 3, 1855 – April 21, 1947) was an American politician who served as a member of the Virginia Senate.

References

External links
 
 

1855 births
1947 deaths
Democratic Party Virginia state senators
20th-century American politicians